Neil Borwick (born 15 September 1967) is a former professional tennis player from Australia. He was born in Redcliffe, Queensland, Australia.

Borwick enjoyed most of his tennis success while playing doubles. During his career, he won one doubles title. In 1992, he achieved his career-high doubles ranking of world No. 60.

Career finals

Doubles: 2 (1–1)

External links
 
 

Australian male tennis players
1967 births
Living people
Tennis players from Brisbane
20th-century Australian people